Sar Asiab-e Karreh (also Romanized as Sar Āsīāb-e Karreh; also known as Sar Āsīāb) is a village in Tut-e Nadeh Rural District, in the Central District of Dana County, Kohgiluyeh and Boyer-Ahmad Province, Iran. At the 2006 census, its population was 115, in 29 families.

References 

Populated places in Dana County